is a Japanese whisky distillery located at the Port of Nagoya Sun Grain facility in the Chita District of the Aichi Prefecture, Japan.  Opened in 1972, it is owned by Suntory.

References

Distilleries in Japan
Japanese whisky
Companies based in Aichi Prefecture
Food and drink companies established in 1973
Japanese brands
1973 establishments in Japan
Suntory